The Masquerade is a 1719 comedy play by the British writer Charles Johnson.

The original Drury Lane cast included Robert Wilks as Sir George Jealous, Thomas Elrington as Ombre, Joe Miller as Smart, Colley Cibber as Masquerader, Henry Norris as Whisper, Anne Oldfield as Sophronia, Sarah Thurmond as Lady Frances Ombre and Christiana Horton as Caelia.

References

Bibliography
 Burling, William J. A Checklist of New Plays and Entertainments on the London Stage, 1700-1737. Fairleigh Dickinson Univ Press, 1992.
 Nicoll, Allardyce. History of English Drama, 1660-1900, Volume 2. Cambridge University Press, 2009.

1719 plays
West End plays
Plays by Charles Johnson
Comedy plays